Statistics of the Scottish Football League in season 1903–04.

Scottish League Division One

Scottish League Division Two

See also
1903–04 in Scottish football

References